Bayramiç Dam is a dam in Çanakkale Province, Turkey. It was built between 1986 and 1996.

See also
List of dams and reservoirs in Turkey

External links
DSI

Dams in Çanakkale Province
Dams completed in 1996